Andrei Sergeyevich Drygin, (born June 12, 1977, in Krasnoyarsk, Russian SFSR), is a Tajikistani alpine skier, originating from Russian family that emigrated to Tajikistan.

Drygin was the flag-bearer and only representative of Tajikistan at the 2002 and 2006 Winter Olympics. He also competed at the 2010 Winter Olympics in Vancouver as the only competitor again but was not the flag bearer.  In 2002, he competed in the giant slalom and Super-G, and failed to finish in either event. In 2006, he finished 51st in the downhill event, with a time of 1:59.41, failed to finish the giant slalom, and finished 51st in the Super-G, with a time of 1:37.85.

References

External links
 "In Praise of the Lone Olympians", Amanda Bauer, Time, February 21, 2002

External links

1977 births
Living people
Tajikistani male alpine skiers
Sportspeople from Krasnoyarsk
Olympic alpine skiers of Tajikistan
Alpine skiers at the 2002 Winter Olympics
Alpine skiers at the 2006 Winter Olympics
Alpine skiers at the 2010 Winter Olympics
Tajikistani people of Russian descent
Alpine skiers at the 2003 Asian Winter Games